Hugh Richard Murnane (29 October 1916 – 13 March 1974) was a former Australian rules footballer who played with Melbourne in the Victorian Football League (VFL), who was widely regarded as the recruit of the year in 1937.

Football
Murnane was recruited from Rochester Football Club in the Bendigo Football League and played 17 games in 1937, debuting in round one against Richmond at the Melbourne Cricket Ground.

Murnane played in Melbourne's 1939 Reserves VFL premiership side, interestingly alongside former Rochester team-mate, Adrian Dullard.

Military service
Murnane later served in the Australian Army for two years during World War II.

Death
He died at Parkville, Victoria on 13 March 1974.

Notes

References

External links 

 
 Hugh Murnane's profile at Demonwiki
 Hugh Murnane at Boyles Football Photos.

1916 births
Australian rules footballers from Victoria (Australia)
Rochester Football Club players
Melbourne Football Club players
1974 deaths